Yaakov "Kobi" Marimi (born October 8, 1991) is an Israeli singer and actor who represented Israel in the Eurovision Song Contest 2019.

Biography 
Yaakov (Kobi) Marimi was born and raised in Ramat Gan, Israel, to a Mizrahi Jewish family of Iraqi-Jewish descent. He served as a soldier in the Israel Defense Forces at the Adjutant Corps. He studied in the Nissan Nativ Acting Studio. Marimi resides in Tel Aviv. He has worked as a pub host and movie theater cashier.

Singing and acting career
During his studies he appeared in the plays The Caucasian Chalk Circle, The Comic Illusion and Prayer.
After graduating from Nissan Nativ he performed in Every Living Thing Needs, Chambaloo's Treasure and performed the role of Natan in Messiah Now for which he won the Promising Actor Award at the 2017 Musical Celebrations in Bat Yam. This was his Israeli Opera debut. Marimi won the award for the most promising actor in Israel's Musical Theatre Festival.

Marimi won the sixth season of HaKokhav HaBa. This earned him the right to represent his country in the Eurovision Song Contest 2019 on home soil. Marimi represented Israel in the Eurovision Song Contest 2019 with the song "Home", and came 23rd out of a total of 41 with 35 points.

In June 2019, Kobi Marimi started performing as Earnest in the production of Spring Awakening at the Israeli National Theater, "Habima".

In September 2019, he released his debut single, "Yalla Bye".

On January 26, he released his third single, "Lo Levad".

Discography

Singles

References 

1991 births
Living people
People from Ramat Gan
21st-century Israeli actors
21st-century Israeli  male singers
Eurovision Song Contest entrants of 2019
Eurovision Song Contest entrants for Israel
Israeli Sephardi Jews
Israeli Mizrahi Jews
Israeli people of Iraqi-Jewish descent